In 2005, Team Dynamics took advantage of a loophole in the British Touring Car Championship regulations that allowed cars to enter, whether they were on sale in the United Kingdom or not. They converted a pair of Honda Integra Japanese imports into BTC Touring spec racing cars, using the internals from the moderately successful Honda Civic Type R that had been competing in the BTCC since 2002. The car was an instant hit, winning its debut race at Donington Park despite only having a limited amount of testing. Matt Neal scored points in every single race to take his first BTCC title - the first for a privateer driver in the modern era. He repeated the feat in 2006 and by that point, five cars had been built, all of them race winners in the hands of the Dynamics drivers, before being passed into the hands of various independent teams. The cars remained in the championship until 2011, in the hands of Lea Wood, even finishing 7th at Oulton Park in that final season  - an impressive result for a car that had been built 6 years previously. Indeed, it was the last of the BTC-Touring spec cars to be used in the BTCC; and was only finally retired as cars built to these regulations could no longer compete in 2012.

Chassis History
Car 1
2005 - Matt Neal
2006 - Mike Jordan
2007 - Mike Jordan
2008 - Andrew Jordan
2009 - Martyn Bell
2010 - John George
Car 2
2005 - Dan Eaves
2006 - David Pinkney
2007 - Unused
2008 - Unused
2009 - John George
2010 - James Kaye
2011 - Dubai 24h - WRC Developments with Barwell

Car 3
2005 - Gareth Howell (Rounds 22-30)
2006 - Gareth Howell (Rounds 19-30)
2007 - Simon Blanckley (Rounds 1-21)/Alan Taylor (Rounds 25-30)
2008 - Alan Taylor
2009 - Unused
2010 - Lea Wood
2011 - Lea Wood

Car 4
2006 - Matt Neal
2007 - John George 
2008 - John George - Written off in an accident at Brands Hatch in the final round of the season.

Car 5
2006 - Gordon Shedden
2007 - Unused
2008 - Mike Jordan
2009 - Paul O'Neill
2010 - Paul O'Neill

References

British Touring Car Championship
Touring cars
Cars introduced in 2005
Front-wheel-drive vehicles
Integra Type-R BTC-T